Colombian Conservatism is a broad system of conservative political beliefs in Colombia that is characterized by protectionism, support for Catholic values, social stability and anti-totalitarianism. Its history began with the creation of two conservative political parties in Colombia. One characteristics of Colombian Conservatism, in contrast to many other geographic subsets of conservatism, is its strong emphasis in protectionism, which is considered by many Colombian conservatives to be necessary to create a fair market.

History 
Colombian conservatism holds Simón Bolívar, and his ideals, as central to its political principles. The first formal conservative Colombian party known as "Republicanos Moderados" was created in 1837 by Jose Ignacio de Marquez. In the image of Bolivar, the party held religious principles and favored order and control. In 1840, a civil war occurred that helped the proliferation of future political parties, including the Colombian Conservative Party, the current principal representative of this ideal.

Colombia has experienced many conservative movements. An example is the "Conservatismo Colombiano" party.

Other movements such as that of Gustavo Rojas Pinilla were influenced by conservative ideals.  

Another important movement created by Nuñez was a coalition between conservatives and moderate liberals called "Partido Nacional".  

The National Popular Alliance was initiated in the 1960s by disillusioned conservatives and it later developed into a populist opposition party. Before the creation of the party, the members were called "Godos". These "Republicanos Moderados" and some other "radical conservatives" led to the beginnings of the Colombian Conservative Party.

Ideals
These ideals have evolved, but the most important are:

Protectionism
Family traditions
Catholic Church
Private property
Support for Colombia as a nation
Individual rights
Social stability

Conservative presidents
Conservative presidents include:
Simón Bolívar
José Ignacio de Márquez
Pedro Alcántara Herrán
Rufino Cuervo Barreto
Manuel María Mallarino
Mariano Ospina Rodríguez
Bartolomé Calvo
Rafael Núñez (*)
Carlos Holguín Mallarino
Miguel Antonio Caro
Manuel Antonio Sanclemente
José Manuel Marroquín
Rafael Reyes
Ramón González Valencia
Carlos Restrepo
José Vicente Concha
Marco Fidel Suárez
Jorge Holguín Mallarino
Pedro Nel Ospina Vásquez
Miguel Avadía Méndez
Mariano Ospina Pérez
Laureano Gómez
Roberto Urdaneta Arbeláez
Guillermo León Valencia
Misael Pastrana Borrero
Belisario Betancur Cuartas
Andrés Pastrana Arango
Álvaro Uribe Vélez (*)
Ivan Duque

(*) Presidents of Liberal origin which implemented conservative policies, since then become allied with conservatism.

References